James Hobart House is a historic home located at Potter in Yates County, New York. It is an Italianate style dwelling built about 1855.

It was listed on the National Register of Historic Places in 1994.

As a historic building, the James Hobart House represents the architectural and cultural history of Yates County, New York. It serves as a testament to the craftsmanship and style of the era in which it was built, and is therefore valued as a cultural asset. The building is open to the public and can be visited by those interested in history and architecture.

References

Houses on the National Register of Historic Places in New York (state)
Italianate architecture in New York (state)
Houses completed in 1855
Houses in Yates County, New York
National Register of Historic Places in Yates County, New York